Ludolph Christian Treviranus (18 September 1779 in Bremen – 6 May 1864 in Bonn) was a German botanist born in Bremen. He was a younger brother to naturalist Gottfried Reinhold Treviranus (1776–1837).

In 1801 he earned his doctorate at the University of Jena, where he had as instructors; botanist August Batsch (1761–1802) and philosophers Friedrich Schelling (1775–1854) and Johann Gottlieb Fichte (1762–1814). In 1807 he was a professor at the Lyceum at Bremen, and in 1812 became a professor of natural history and botany at the University of Rostock, where he was also director of the botanical gardens. In 1816 he replaced Johann Heinrich Friedrich Link (1767–1851) as professor of botany at the University of Breslau, and in 1820 transferred to the University of Bonn, where he was successor to Christian Gottfried Daniel Nees von Esenbeck (1776–1858). Treviranus remained at Bonn until his death in 1864.

In his earlier studies, he worked mostly in the fields of plant anatomy and physiology, afterwards focusing on taxonomic issues. Between 1815 and 1828, he published noted works on the sexuality and embryology of phanerogams. He is credited for discovery of the intercellular space in a plant's parenchyma.

The botanical genus Trevirana (Gesneriaceae) was named in his honor by Carl Ludwig Willdenow (1765–1812).

Selected writings 
 Vom inwendigen Bau der Gewächse (On the inward construction of plants), (1806).
 Beiträge zur Pflanzenphysiologie (Contributions to plant physiology), (1811).
 Von der Entwickelung des Embryo und seiner Umhüllungen im Pflanzenei (On the development of the embryo and its sheaths in Pflanzenei), (1815).
 De ovo vegetabili ejusque mutationibus observationes recentiores, (1828).
 Physiologie der Gewächse (Physiology of plants, two volumes), (1835–38).

References 
 Biographical information is based on a translation of an article at the German Wikipedia, that includes information from  Allgemeine Deutsche Biographie.

External links 
 IPNI List of plants described by Treviranus.

German taxonomists
1779 births
1864 deaths
Botanists with author abbreviations
Academic staff of the University of Bonn
Academic staff of the University of Rostock
Academic staff of the University of Breslau
Scientists from Bremen
19th-century German botanists